Saint-Rémy or Saint-Remy (French for Saint Remigius) may refer to:

Places

Belgium
 Saint-Remy, district of the municipality of Chimay, province of Hainaut, Wallonia
 Saint-Remy, district of the municipality of Blegny, province of Liège, Wallonia

France

Saint-Rémy, Ain, in the Ain  département 
Saint-Rémy, Aveyron, in the Aveyron  département 
Saint-Rémy, Calvados, in the Calvados  département
Saint-Rémy, Corrèze, in the Corrèze département 
Saint-Rémy, Côte-d'Or, in the Côte-d'Or  département
Saint-Rémy, Deux-Sèvres, in the Deux-Sèvres  département
Saint-Rémy, Dordogne, in the Dordogne  département 
Saint-Rémy, Saône-et-Loire, in the Saône-et-Loire  département
Saint-Remy, Vosges, in the Vosges  département (without the accent aigu)
Saint-Rémy-au-Bois, in the Pas-de-Calais  département
Saint-Rémy-aux-Bois, in the Meurthe-et-Moselle  département 
Saint-Rémy-Blanzy, in the Aisne  département 
Saint-Rémy-Boscrocourt, in the Seine-Maritime  département 
Saint-Remy-Chaussée, in the Nord  département
Saint-Rémy-de-Blot, in the Puy-de-Dôme  département 
Saint-Rémy-de-Chargnat, in the Puy-de-Dôme  département
Saint-Rémy-de-Chaudes-Aigues, in the Cantal  département 
Saint-Rémy-de-Maurienne, in the Savoie  département 
Saint-Rémy-de-Provence, in the Bouches-du-Rhône  département 
Saint-Rémy-de-Sillé, in the Sarthe  département 
Saint-Rémy-des-Landes, in the Manche  département 
Saint-Rémy-des-Monts, in the Sarthe  département 
Saint-Remy-du-Nord, in the Nord  département 
Saint-Rémy-du-Plain, in the Ille-et-Vilaine  département 
Saint-Rémy-du-Val, in the Sarthe  département 
Saint-Remy-en-Bouzemont-Saint-Genest-et-Isson, in the Marne  département 
Saint-Rémy-en-Comté, in the Haute-Saône département
Saint-Remy-en-l'Eau, in the Oise  département 
Saint-Rémy-en-Mauges, in the Maine-et-Loire  département 
Saint-Rémy-en-Rollat, in the Allier  département 
Saint-Rémy-l'Honoré, in the Yvelines  département 
Saint-Remy-la-Calonne, in the Meuse  département 
Saint-Rémy-la-Vanne, in the Seine-et-Marne  département 
Saint-Rémy-la-Varenne, in the Maine-et-Loire  département
Saint-Remy-le-Petit, in the Ardennes  département 
Saint-Rémy-lès-Chevreuse, in the Yvelines  département
Saint-Remy-sous-Barbuise, in the Aube  département 
Saint-Remy-sous-Broyes, in the Marne  département 
Saint-Rémy-sur-Avre, in the Eure-et-Loir  département 
Saint-Remy-sur-Bussy, in the Marne  département
Saint-Rémy-sur-Creuse, in the Vienne  département 
Saint-Rémy-sur-Durolle, in the Puy-de-Dôme  département

Surname
Jean Le Fèvre de Saint-Remy (c.1394-1468), Burgundian seigneur and chronicler
Joseph Saint-Rémy, Haitian historian
 M. de Saint-Remy, a pseudonym used by Charles Auguste Louis Joseph, duc de Morny

See also

 Saint-Rémi, Quebec